This is a list of yearly Triangular Football League standings.

Triangular Football League standings

Northern Intercollegiate Football Association

Eastern Intercollegiate Football Association

New England Intercollegiate Football Association / Triangular Football League

References

Triangular Football League
Standings